Hamílton Hênio Ferreira Calheiros (born June 26, 1980), known simply as Hamílton, is a retired footballer who played as a midfielder.

Born in Brazil, he was a member, as a naturalized citizen, of the Togo national team.

Biography
Hamílton was born in Murici, a municipality located in the western of the Brazilian state of Alagoas.

International career
Hamílton was naturalized as Togolese in 2003 by request of fellow Brazilian Antônio Dumas, who was then the Togo national team head coach. After winning that year the Campeonato Sergipano with CS Sergipe, the Togolese Football Federation (FTF) president agreed Dumas' petition to call up him for the next Togo international matches.

Hamílton's only appearance for Togo was on October 11, 2003 in an away World Cup 2006 Qualifying match against Equatorial Guinea. That day Les Eperviers lost (0–1). He did not play in the second leg because he had left the Togolese passport in the Federation.

In early 2004, when Dumas resigned as head coach, Hamílton and most of the other Brazilian-born players who made up the Togolese squad in 2003 second half were dropped, excepting Alessandro Faria, who played some more matches in 2004.

On 10 July 2009, following some Hamílton's appearances at the 2009 Copa Libertadores with Sport Recife, appeared a news about the FTF resumed contact with him for can be called again, almost 6 years of his unique appearance.

Hamílton was called up for a friendly against Angola on August 12, 2009. However, he did not attended the call as he has had a discipline problem occurred during a Campeonato Brasileiro Série A (Brasileirão) match between his club (Sport Recife) and Palmeiras a few days before.

Hamílton was going to be present for the 2010 FIFA World Cup qualification against Morocco on 6 September 2009. Nevertheless, he has not been liberated by Sport Recife because the Togolese federation did not send it a corresponding notification.

The Togolese national team returned to call Hamílton for the 2010 FIFA World Cup qualification against Cameroon on 10 October 2009. A few days later, he asked FTF to not attend the match as he wanted to help Sport Recife at the Brasileirão, following poor performances (the Brazilian championship was not paused at FIFA dates).

In December 2009, Hamílton was included in the Togolese preliminary list for the 2010 African Cup of Nations but he refused to go, just because he wanted to spend the year-end holidays in the interior of Sergipe. Ultimately, he avoided be part of the Togo national football team attack.

Honours
Sergipe
Campeonato Sergipano: 2003

Sport Recife
Campeonato Pernambucano: 2006, 2009

Career statistics

References

External links

Hamílton on meuSport 

1980 births
Living people
Sportspeople from Alagoas
Togolese footballers
Togo international footballers
Brazilian footballers
Brazilian emigrants to Togo
Naturalized citizens of Togo
Association football midfielders
Campeonato Brasileiro Série A players
Campeonato Pernambucano players
Clube Náutico Capibaribe players
Sport Club do Recife players
Campeonato Brasileiro Série B players
Club Sportivo Sergipe players
Mogi Mirim Esporte Clube players
ABC Futebol Clube players
Ceará Sporting Club players
Campeonato Brasileiro Série C players
Associação Desportiva Confiança players
Campeonato Brasileiro Série D players
Estanciano Esporte Clube players
Süper Lig players
Ankaraspor footballers
Togolese expatriate footballers
Togolese expatriate sportspeople in Turkey
Brazilian expatriate footballers
Brazilian expatriate sportspeople in Turkey
Expatriate footballers in Turkey
21st-century Togolese people